XHLPZ-FM is a radio station on 95.3 FM in Lampazos, Nuevo León with studios in Ciudad Anáhuac. The station is owned by Organización Radiofónica del Norte and is known as La Traviesa.

History
XHLPZ received its concession on April 3, 1995. It was owned by Miguel Ernesto Hinojosa Margain and transferred to ORN in 2003.

References

Radio stations in Nuevo León
Radio stations established in 1995